In 1880, the Prince of Liechtenstein permitted religious freedom in the country. For several years pastors from Switzerland and Austria served the Protestant community. In 1963 a church was built in Vaduz. The Evangelical Church in Liechtenstein adopted this name in 1970 and includes Calvinist and Lutheran churches.

References

External links
 Official website

Christianity in Liechtenstein
Lutheran denominations